The heavy cruiser was designed for long range, high speed, and heavy calibre naval guns. The first heavy cruisers were built in 1915, although it only became a widespread classification following the London Naval Treaty in 1930. The heavy cruiser's immediate precursors were the light cruiser designs of the 1910s and 1920s; the US 8-inch 'treaty cruisers' of the 1920s were originally classed as light cruisers until the London Treaty forced their redesignation. Heavy cruisers continued in use until after World War II.

The German  was a series of three Panzerschiffe ("armored ships"), a form of heavily armed cruiser, built by the German Reichsmarine in nominal accordance with restrictions imposed by the Treaty of Versailles. The class is named after the first ship of this class to be completed. All three ships were launched between 1931 and 1934, and served with Germany's Kriegsmarine during World War II. During the war, they were reclassified as heavy cruisers.

The British press began referring to the vessels as pocket battleships, in reference to the heavy firepower contained in the relatively small vessels; they were considerably smaller than contemporary battleships, though at 28 knots, were slower than battlecruisers. And although their displacement and scale of armor protection was that of a heavy cruiser, they were armed with guns larger than the heavy cruisers of other nations. Deutschland-class ships continue to be called pocket battleships in some circles.

A tactical shortcoming was recognized after completing six additional conversions of s. Having sacrificed anti-ship weapons for anti-aircraft armament, the converted anti-aircraft cruisers might need protection themselves against surface units. New construction was undertaken to create cruisers of similar speed and displacement with dual-purpose guns. Dual-purpose guns offered good anti-aircraft protection with anti-surface capability for the traditional light cruiser role of defending capital ships from destroyers. The first purpose built anti-aircraft cruiser was the British , completed shortly before the beginning of World War II. The US Navy  anti-aircraft cruisers (CLAA) were designed to match capabilities of the Royal Navy. Both Dido and Atlanta carried torpedo tubes.

The List of ships of World War II contains major military vessels of the war, arranged alphabetically and by type. The list includes armed vessels that served during the war and in the immediate aftermath, inclusive of localized ongoing combat operations, garrison surrenders, post-surrender occupation, colony re-occupation, troop and prisoner repatriation, to the end of 1945. For smaller vessels, see also List of World War II ships of less than 1000 tons. Some uncompleted Axis ships are included, out of historic interest. Ships are designated to the country under which they operated for the longest period of the World War II, regardless of where they were built or previous service history.

List
Click on headers to sort columns.

See also

References

Bibliography

 
World War II
Cruisers